Tai Tong Road is an at-grade MTR Light Rail stop located at the junction of Castle Peak Road and Tai Tong Road in Yuen Long District. It began service on 18 September 1988 and belongs to Zone 5. This stop used to be known as "" in Chinese but it was renamed to "" on 13 June 2010; its English name remains unchanged.

References

MTR Light Rail stops
Former Kowloon–Canton Railway stations
Yuen Long District
Railway stations in Hong Kong opened in 1988